Adela Elena Popescu (born 8 October 1986 in Șușani, Vâlcea County) is a Romanian actress and singer.

Popescu is notable for being among the original cast in the first Romanian soap opera, Numai Iubirea (Only Love), where she was paired with actor Dan Bordeianu. In 2010 she met her future husband, actor and TV presenter Radu Valcan.

In 2014 Popescu participated in the ALS Ice Bucket Challenge to raise public awareness of amyotrophic lateral sclerosis, a fatal disease of the motor neurons.

Works

Television
 My Little Ponny : The Movie (Romanian version) 
2014 — "O Nouă Viață" (A New Life), Raluca Dumitrescu
2011–2013 — "Pariu Cu Viața" (Bet With Life), Raluca Dumitrescu 
2010–2011 — '"Iubire & Onoare" (Love and Honor), Carmen Florescu
2010 — "Dansez pentru tine" (Dancing with the stars), won 2nd place
2009–2010 — "Aniela"(Aniela), Aniela Elefterios
2008–2009 — "Îngeraşii" (Little angels), Lia Damian
2007–2008 — "Razboiul sexelor" (The battle of the sexes)
2006–2007 — "Iubire ca în filme" (Living a movie romance), Ioana Ionescu
2005–2006 — "Lacrimi de iubire" (Tears of love), Alexandra Mateescu
2004–2005 — "Numai iubirea" (Only Love), Alina Damaschin
2002–2003 — "In familie" (All in the family), Anca Ionescu

Music
2010 – "Aniela"
2009 – "Weekend"
2008 – "O 9 zi in al 9lea cer" (9th Heaven)
2008 — "Raspunsul meu" (My answer)
2008– "Ingerasii" (Little Angels)
2006 — "Iubire ca în filme" (Living a movie romance)
2005 — "Lacrimi de iubire" (Tears of love)

References

External links

1986 births
Living people
Romanian television actresses
Romanian soap opera actresses
21st-century Romanian singers
21st-century Romanian actresses
People from Vâlcea County
21st-century Romanian women singers